Attila Csipler (17 March 1939 – 1996) was a Romanian fencer. He competed at the 1960 and 1964 Summer Olympics.

References

1939 births
1996 deaths
Romanian male fencers
Romanian foil fencers
Olympic fencers of Romania
Fencers at the 1960 Summer Olympics
Fencers at the 1964 Summer Olympics
Sportspeople from Satu Mare